Miguel Adedayo Azeez Beloso (born 20 September 2002) is an English professional footballer who plays as a midfielder for Wigan Athletic on loan from Arsenal.

Club career
Azeez started his career with Arsenal's youth academy at the age of 5. On 24 September 2019, Azeez was given a professional contract by Arsenal. He made his first team debut on 10 December 2020, replacing Joe Willock in the 83rd minute of a 4–2 UEFA Europa League win away to Irish side Dundalk at the Aviva Stadium.

On 30 August 2021, Azeez joined EFL League One club Portsmouth on loan for the remainder of the season. He made his debut for the club on 18 September 2021 against Cambridge United, but was substituted after 59 minutes as Portsmouth lost 2–1. He scored his first goal for the club on 9 November 2021 in an EFL Trophy tie against Crystal Palace U21s. Arsenal recalled Azeez from Portsmouth on 17 January 2022.

On 1 September 2022, Azeez was loaned to Spanish Segunda División side UD Ibiza for the season.

On 10 January 2023, Azeez joined Championship club Wigan Athletic on loan until the end of the season.

International career
Azeez was born in England to a Nigerian father and a Spanish mother. Azeez has represented England at under-16, under-17, under-18, under-19 and under-20 levels.

Personal life
Azeez was born in England to a Nigerian father and Spanish mother. His older brother Femi plays as a professional footballer for Reading.

Career statistics

References

2002 births
Living people
English footballers
England youth international footballers
English sportspeople of Nigerian descent
English people of Spanish descent
Association football midfielders
Arsenal F.C. players
Portsmouth F.C. players
UD Ibiza players
Wigan Athletic F.C. players
English Football League players
Segunda División players
English expatriate footballers
Expatriate footballers in Spain
English expatriate sportspeople in Spain